Ben Knight (born 1 December 1975) is an Australian actor.

Career
Knight, often credited as Ben Kermode commenced his career as an actor in 1997, when he made a guest appearance in the Australian television series State Coroner.  What followed was two further guest roles on the series Good Guys Bad Guys and Introducing Gary Petty before his career took a five-year hiatus.  In 2005, Knight returned to acting with the short film Smacked Out Kisses.  In 2009, he received a short recurring role on Seven Network soap opera Home and Away, for which he played Hazem Kassir, the love interest of Leah Patterson-Baker.  He played the role of Hazem near the end of the 2009 season until early 2010 when his character was involved in a controversial storyline, in which he is brutally beaten by a group of racist thugs on Australia Day.  In 2009, Knight starred in the short film Rikki, in which he served as director, writer, producer, editor and composer of the film.  He has appeared in several feature films during his career, first being an uncredited role in the thriller The Nines, with Ryan Reynolds, David & Fatima and the horror film Prey, with Natalie Bassingthwaighte.  His other credits include the short film Road to Ramadi, the television series Review with Myles Barlow, City Homicide, and Neighbours.

Filmography

References

External links

Ben Knight website

1975 births
Living people
Australian male television actors
Australian male film actors
People from Victoria (Australia)
Male actors from Melbourne